The South African Law Reform Commission (SALRC) is a law reform commission which investigates the state of South African law and makes proposals for its reform to Parliament and the provincial legislatures. It is an independent advisory statutory body established by the South African Law Reform Commission Act of 1973. It investigates matters appearing on a programme approved by the Minister of Justice and Constitutional Development. The commission is part of the Commonwealth Association of Law Reform Agencies.

Members of the Commission

The members of the SALRC are appointed by the President and are drawn from the judiciary, legal profession and academic institutions. The current members of the SALRC are:
Judge Narandran Kollapen (Chairperson)
Mr Irvin Lawrence (Vice-Chairperson)
Prof Mpfariseni Budeli-Nemakonde
Prof Karthigasen Govender
Prof Wesahl Domingo
Adv Tshepo Sibeko
Adv HJ de Waal SC
Adv Anthea Platt SC
Adv Hendrina Magaretha Meintjes SC

A new Commission is appointed every five years, the last appointment being in 2018.

In February 2012, the Minister of Justice and Constitutional Development Jeff Radebe told reporters that the SALRC would be re-engineered to boost its legal research capacity and to better serve the needs of South Africa.

References

External links
 Official site of the South African Law Reform Commission

 
Government of South Africa
Government agencies of South Africa
Law commissions
Law reform in South Africa